"Stay" is the fifth single from Christian singer-songwriter Jeremy Camp's first major label full-length album Stay, released on June 24, 2003.

Awards

On 2005, the song won a Dove Award for Rock Recorded Song of the Year at the 36th GMA Dove Awards.

References

External links
 "Music Video and Lyrics"
 "Live Unplugged"

Jeremy Camp songs
2003 singles
2002 songs
Songs written by Jeremy Camp